The following is a list of notable deaths in August 2001.

Entries for each day are listed alphabetically by surname. A typical entry lists information in the following sequence:
 Name, age, country of citizenship at birth, subsequent country of citizenship (if applicable), reason for notability, cause of death (if known), and reference.

August 2001

1
Zuzana Chalupová, 76, Serbian/Yugoslavian naïve painter.
Jay Chamberlain, 77, American racing driver.
Dwight Eddleman, 78, American basketball player and Olympic athlete, heart ailment.
Joe Lynch, 76, Irish actor.
Begum Aizaz Rasul, 92, Indian politician.
Robert Rimmer, 84, American writer.
Korey Stringer, 27, American football player (Ohio State, Minnesota Vikings), complications following a heat stroke.
Nicolae Tătaru, 69, Romanian football player.
Dan Towler, 73, American gridiron football player.

2
James A. Corbett, 67, American rancher and philosopher.
Valerie Davies, 89, British Olympic swimmer, bronze medalist (1932).
Sir Edward Gardner, 89, British politician.
Lawrence Minard, 51, American journalist and editor, heart attack.
Ronald Townson, 68, American vocalist (The 5th Dimension).

3
Henriette Bie Lorentzen, 90, Norwegian activist.
Louis Chevalier, 90, French historian with interests in geography, demography and sociology.
Christopher Hewett, 80, British actor (Mr. Belvedere, The Producers, Fantasy Island).
Frank Pakenham, 7th Earl of Longford, 95, British politician and social reformer.
Mario Perazzolo, 90, Italian footballer.
Lars Johan Werle, 75, Swedish composer.

4
S. K. Bhatnagar, 71, Indian politician and diplomat.
Claude Bloodgood, 64, American chess player and convicted murderer, cancer.
Michael Cole, 68, British writer.
Joseph Cooper, 88, British pianist and broadcaster.
Jack Maple, 48, American police officer and author, cancer.
Lorenzo Music, 64, American voice actor known for the voice of the cartoon cat Garfield, complications related to lung and bone cancer.

5
Otema Allimadi, 72, Ugandan Foreign Minister (1979–1980) and Prime Minister of Uganda (1980–1985).
Iskra Babich, 69, Soviet film director and screenwriter.
Miloš Bojović, 63, Serbian basketball player, sports journalist, and politician.
Caro Crawford Brown, 93, American journalist and Pulitzer Prize winner.
Roy D. Chapin Jr., 85, American business executive (Chairman and Chief Executive Officer of American Motors Corporation).
Aaron Flahavan, 25, English football goalkeeper, car accident.
Bahne Rabe, 37, German rower, Olympic champion (1988).
Priscilla Roberts, 85, American artist.
Christopher Skase, 52, Australian businessman and fraudster, stomach cancer.
Patricia Woodroffe, 75, New Zealand fencer.

6
Larry Adler, 87, American harmonica player, cancer.
Jorge Amado, 88, Brazilian writer.
Wina Born, 80, Dutch journalist and cooking books author.
Hans Gruber, 76, Austrian-Canadian conductor (Victoria Symphony, University of Toronto).
Robert Dunham, 70, American actor, writer, and racecar driver.
Adhar Kumar Chatterji, 86, Indian Navy admiral.
Vasili Kuznetsov, 69, Russian decathlete.
Kenneth MacDonald, 50, English actor, heart attack.
Jim Mallory, 82, American baseball player and football coach.
Dương Văn Minh, 85, South Vietnamese politician and ARVN general.
Wilhelm Mohnke, 90, German SS general during World War II.
Alan Rafkin, 73, American actor, director and producer.
Shan Ratnam, 73, Singaporean andrologist.
Dick Rehbein, 45, American football coach, cardiomyopathy.
Dame Dorothy Tutin, 71, British actress (The Importance of Being Earnest, The Beggar's Opera, A Tale of Two Cities, The Shooting Party).

7
Paul Richard Averitt, 78, American soldier and Holocaust photographer.
Billy Byrd, 81, American country guitarist.
Dan Edwards, 75, American professional football player (1948–1957) and coach (1958–1961).
Jack James, 80, American rocket engineer who worked at the Jet Propulsion Laboratory (Project Manager for NASA's Mariner program).
Robert Kraus, 76, American children's author and cartoonist.

8
John Deacon, 38, British motorcycle racer, motorcycle accident.
Jean Dorst, 77, French ornithologist, former director of the National Museum of Natural History in Paris.
Jean-Louis Flandrin, 70, French historian.
John A. Hostetler, 82, American scholar.
George Mann, 83, English cricketer.
Noud van Melis, 77, Dutch football player.
Maureen Reagan, 60, American political activist and daughter of Ronald Reagan, melanoma.
Nora Sayre, 68, American film critic and essayist.
Peter Sinclair, 62, New Zealand radio personality.
Paul Vaessen, 39, English footballer.
Patrick David Wall, 76, British neuroscientist.
Paul Weatherley, 84, British botanist.

9
Abe Bonnema, 74, Dutch architect.
Humphry Bowen, 72, British botanist and chemist.
Jacky Boxberger, French athlete, killed by an elephant
Elmer Knutson, 86, Canadian businessman, activist and politician.
John Gordon Lane, 85, Canadian politician.
Sir Alec Skempton, 87, British scientist.

10
Gertrude Bleiberg, 80, American visual artist.
François Brochet, 76, French sculptor, painter and printer.
Lou Boudreau, 84, American baseball player and manager, seven-time All-Star and a member of the Baseball Hall of Fame.
Álvaro Carolino, 50, Portuguese football player and manager, pulmonary complications.
Elsa Cavelti, 94, Swiss operatic contralto and mezzo-soprano.
Aladár Donászi, 46, Hungarian robber and serial killer, suicide.
Manfred Eglin, 65, German footballer.
Vasudeo S. Gaitonde, Indian painter.
Edward Gaskin, 83, Panamanian educator and labor leader.
Bob Johnson, 60, British businessman and philanthropist.
Gianfranco Miglio, 83, Italian jurist, political scientist and politician.
Ramón Monzant, 68, Venezuelan baseball player.
Dietrich Peltz, 87, German Luftwaffe bomber and Wehrmacht general during World War II.
Stanislav Rostotsky, 79, Soviet/Russian film director and screenwriter.
Michael Sumpter, 53, American serial killer, cancer.

11
Paul Cunniffe, 40, Irish singer-songwriter, fall from balcony.
Edward Thomas Hall, 77, British scientist, known for exposing the Piltdown Man as a fraud.
James Lechay, 94, American painter.
Barbara Ruszczyc, 72, Polish Egyptologist and art historian.
Percy Stallard, 92, British racing cyclist.
Kevin Kowalcyk, 2, American boy, known for eating a hamburger contaminated with E. coli O157:H7.

12
Irene Astor, Baroness Astor of Hever, 81, English noblewoman and philanthropist.
Pierre Klossowski, 96, French writer, translator and artist.
Milton Kohn, 88, American architect.
Julian Pitt-Rivers, 82, British social anthropologist and ethnographer.
Sir Walter Walker, 88, British army general.

13
Manuel Alvar, 78, Spanish linguist, historian, and university professor.
René Berthier, 89, French actor.
John C. Elliott, 82, American politician and 39th Governor of American Samoa.
Sir John Hoddinott, 56, British police officer.
Jim Hughes, 78, American baseball player.
R.S. Jones, 47, American novelist and editor (HarperCollins Publishers).
Gabor Peterdi, 85, Hungarian-American painter and printmaker.
Alan Skene, 68, South African rugby player.
Otto Stuppacher, 54, Austrian race car driver.
Antonio Zumel, 69, Filipino journalist, activist, and revolutionary.

14
Earl Anthony, 63, American professional bowler.
Oscar Janiger, 83, American experimental psychiatrist, known for his LSD research.
Jackie "Butch" Jenkins, 63, American child actor.
Ridgway B. Knight, 90, American diplomat and ambassador.
Sir Graham Shillington, 90, Northern Irish police officer.

15
Yavuz Çetin, 30, Turkish musician, suicide.
Richard Chelimo, 29, Kenyan Olympic long-distance runner (silver medal winner of the men's 10,000 metres at the 1992 Summer Olympics).
Gale Cincotta, 72, American community activist.
Raymond Edward Johnson, 90, American radio and stage actor (Inner Sanctum Mysteries).
Peter Mazur, 78, Austrian-Dutch physicist.
Jim Russell, 92, Australian cartoonist.
Sir Roderick Sarell, 88, British diplomat.
Kateryna Yushchenko, 81, Ukrainian computer and information research scientist.

16
Dave Barry, 82, American actor and comedian.
Kenneth Reese Cole Jr., 63, American political aide to Richard Nixon.
Ruperto Donoso, 86, Chilean jockey.
Fred Glover, 73, Canadian professional ice hockey player (Chicago Black Hawks, Detroit Red Wings, Cleveland Barons) and coach (Oakland Seals, Los Angeles Kings).
Kaadsiddheshwar, 96, Indian Hindu guru.
Anna Mani, 82, Indian physicist and meteorologist.
Floyd Spence, 73, American attorney and a politician, cerebral thrombosis.
Sidney Tillim, 76, American artist and art critic.

17
Josef Fried, 87, Polish-American organic chemist, member of the National Academy of Sciences and the American Academy of Arts and Sciences.
Herman Goffberg, 80, American Olympic long-distance runner (men's 10,000 metres at the 1948 Summer Olympics).
Emil Gorovets, 78, Soviet Ukrainian singer.
Živko Nikolić, 59, Yugoslav and Montenegrin film director.
Charles Palmer, 71, British martial artist.
Flip Phillips, 86, American jazz tenor saxophone and clarinet player.
Sir Ralph Verney, 5th Baronet, 86, British army officer and conservationist.

18
Edmund Cambridge, 80, American actor and director, complications from a fall.
Roland Cardon, 72, Belgian composer, music teacher, and multi-instrumentalist.
Jack Elliott, 74, American film and television music composer, conductor and arranger (Barney Miller, Charlie's Angels, The Love Boat, The Jerk, Oh God!).
Hillel Kook, 86, Russian/American Revisionist Zionist activist and politician.
David Peakall, 70, British environmental toxicologist and ornithologist.
Toppur Seethapathy Sadasivan, 88, Indian plant pathologist.
Tom Watson, 69, Scottish actor.

19
Betty Everett, 61, American soul singer and pianist ("The Shoop Shoop Song", "Let It Be Me").
Pericle Luigi Giovannetti, 85, Italian/Swiss painter and illustrator.
Sylvia Millecam, 45, Dutch actress and comedian, breast cancer.
Dean Roper, 62, American stock car racer, heart attack.
Les Sealey, 43, English footballer, heart attack.
Inder Singh, 57, Indian Olympic hockey player.
Willy Vannitsen, 66, Belgian racing cyclist.
Donald Woods, 67, South African journalist, newspaper editor, and anti-apartheid activist.

20
Richard Cloward, 74, American sociologist and activist (National Voter Registration Act of 1993).
Neal Colzie, 48, American gridiron football player (Oakland Raiders, Miami Dolphins, Tampa Bay Buccaneers), heart attack.
Hazzard Dill, 82, Bermudian Olympic sprinter (1948 Summer Olympics).
Hainer Hill, 88, German costume designer, painter and graphic artist.
Sir Fred Hoyle, 86, British astronomer and science fiction writer.
Anthony Michael Juliano, 78, American bank robber.
Walter Reed, 85, American stage, film and television actor.
Eliezer Shostak, 89, Israeli politician.
Kim Stanley, 76, American actress (Séance on a Wet Afternoon, The Right Stuff, Frances), Emmy winner (1963, 1985).
Rolla M. Tryon Jr., 84, American botanist.

21
Beryl Cooke, 94, British actress.
Kathleen Deery de Phelps, 92, Australian-Venezuelan explorer, conservationist, and pacifist.
Pál Engel, 63, Hungarian historian.
Steven Izenour, 61, American architect and author (Learning from Las Vegas).
John Kerins, 39, Irish Gaelic footballer, cancer.
Calum MacKay, 74, Canadian professional ice hockey player.
Norman Rigby, 78, English footballer and manager.
John H. Wotiz, 82, Czech-American chemist, car accident.

22
Tatyana Averina, 51, Soviet Russian Olympic speed skater (won two gold medals and two bronze medals at the 1976 Winter Olympics).
Rose Edgcumbe, 67, British psychologist, psychoanalyst, and academic.
Bernard Heuvelmans, 84, French scientist.
Bobby Johnstone, 71, Scottish footballer (Hibernian, Manchester City, Oldham Athletic, Scotland).
Tage Jönsson, 81, Swedish Olympic racewalker (men's 50 kilometres walk at the 1948 Summer Olympics).
Stefan Kanchev, 86, Bulgarian graphic artist.
Spiro Koleka, 93, Albanian communist politician and statesman.
Sharad Talwalkar, 82, Indian actor, heart attack.

23
Eric Allandale, 65, British jazz musician.
Howard Fletcher, 88, American college football player and head coach (Northern Illinois University).
Frank Emilio Flynn, 80, Cuban pianist.
Ray Frederick, 72, Canadian professional ice hockey player (Chicago Black Hawks).
Kathleen Freeman, 78, American actress (Wagon Train, North to Alaska, The Nutty Professor).
Herbert Haag, 86, German-Swiss Roman Catholic theologian and biblical scholar (known for challenging the Vatican).
Shirley Kleinhans, 72, American baseball player (All-American Girls Professional Baseball League).
Henriette Bie Lorentzen, 90, Norwegian journalist, peace activist, feminist, and publisher.
Peter Maas, 72, American journalist and author (Serpico, The Valachi Papers).
Hukukane Nikaido, 78, Japanese economist.
Gordon Ogden, 92, Australian rules footballer.
Doc Terry, 79, American blues musician.

24
Jane Greer, 76, American film and television actress (Out of the Past).
Milan Kadlec, 42, Czechoslovakian Olympic pentathlete (team and individual modern pentathlon at the 1980 Summer Olympics and 1988 Summer Olympics).
Helen McGrath, 59, Scottish trade unionist.
Hank Sauer, 84, American baseball player (1952 Most Valuable Player) ("The Mayor of Wrigley Field").
Raymond Wilding-White, 78, American composer.

25
Aaliyah, 22, American R&B singer and actress (Romeo Must Die), plane crash.
Raymond Abescat, 109, French veteran of World War I.
Madge Adam, 89, English astronomer.
Mary Barnard, 91, American poet, biographer and translator.
Carl Brewer, 62, Canadian ice hockey player.
John Chambers, 78, American make-up artist and first civilian to receive the Intelligence Medal of Merit.
Diana Golden, 38, American disabled ski racer, cancer.
Inigo Jackson, 68, English actor.
Philippe Léotard, 60, French actor and singer, respiratory failure.
Ginzō Matsuo, 50, Japanese voice actor, subarachnoid hemorrhage.
John L. Nelson, 85, American jazz musician, songwriter and father of Prince.
Harry Ramberg, 92, Swedish tennis player.
Asit Sen, 78, Bengali Indian film director, cinematographer and screenwriter.
Ben Oumar Sy, 75, Malian footballer player and manager.
Ken Tyrrell, 75, British motor racing driver and team leader, pancreatic cancer.

26
John Horn, 69, British tennis player.
Louis Muhlstock, 97, Canadian painter.
Cecil Null, 74, American songwriter, cancer.
Marita Petersen, 60, Prime Minister of the Faroe Islands and first female speaker of the House, cancer.
Al Pittman, 61, Canadian poet and playwright.

27
Michael Dertouzos, 64, Greek-American professor, computer scientist and Director of the MIT Laboratory for Computer Science (LCS) from 1974 to 2001.
John Joe Landers, 94, Irish Gaelic footballer.
Juan Lechín Oquendo, 87, Bolivian politician, Vice President (1960–1964).
Abu Ali Mustafa, 63, Palestinian leader and Secretary General of the Popular Front for the Liberation of Palestine (PFLP).
Karl Ulrich Schnabel, 92, Austrian pianist.
Ethel Scull, American art collector.

28
James Homer Elledge, 58, American convicted murderer, executed by lethal injection in Washington.
Bert Gardiner, 88, Canadian professional ice hockey player (Montreal Canadiens, Chicago Black Hawks, Boston Bruins, New York Rangers).
Käthe Grasegger, 84, German Olympic alpine skier (silver medal winner in women's combined alpine skiing at the 1936 Winter Olympics).
David P. Harmon, 82, American scenarist and producer.
Johan Frederik Holleman, 85, Dutch- South African ethnologist and legal scholar.
Kenneth Maddocks, 94, British colonial official and Governor of Fiji (1958–1963).
Juan Muñoz, 48, Spanish sculptor.
Serhiy Perkhun, 23, Ukrainian footballer.
Remy Presas, 64, Filipino martial artist and founder of Modern Arnis, brain cancer.
Sir Reo Stakis, 88, Cypriot-born British hotelier.

29
Roger Daley, 58, British meteorologist.
Victor Jörgensen, 77, Danish Olympic boxer (bronze medal winner in welterweight boxing at the 1952 Summer Olympics).
Manubhai Pancholi, 86, Indian novelist, author, and politician.
Sid Peterson, 83, American baseball player.
Francisco Rabal, 75, Spanish actor.
Dick Selma, 57, American baseball player.
Graeme "Shirley" Strachan, 50, Australian singer (Skyhooks) and television presenter.
Eric Tipton, 86, American baseball player.
Gentile Tondino, 77, Canadian educator and artist.
Dame Olga Uvarov, 91, Russian-born British veterinarian.

30
A. F. M. Ahsanuddin Chowdhury, 86, 9th President of Bangladesh.
Julie Bishop, 87, American actress (Sands of Iwo Jima, Princess O'Rourke, Northern Pursuit, The High and the Mighty).
Stan Harland, 61, English football player.
Govan Mbeki, 91, South African politician, leader of the ANC and SACP.
G. K. Moopanar, 70, Indian Politician, Rajya sabha Member
Dilli Raman Regmi, 87, Nepali historian and politician.
Kothamangalam Seenu, 91, Tamil actor and singer.

31
Sir Eric Bullus, 94, British politician.
Crash Davis, 82, American baseball player.
Rex Forrester, 72, New Zealand hunting and fishing specialist and outdoor sports author.
Paul Hamlyn, Baron Hamlyn, 75, British publisher and philanthropist.
Connie Hill, 83, Canadian ice hockey player.
James Petrie, 59, British pharmacologist.

References 

2001-08
 08